Durborow may refer to:

Allan C. Durborow, Jr. (1857–1908), American politician
Charles Durborow, distance swimmer